Alex Agius Saliba (born 31 January 1988) is a Maltese politician, Member of the European Parliament since 2019 for the Labour Party.

Biography 

Born Alex Saliba, he studied at Tarxien primary school and at St. Augustine's College.

At 17 years, he joined the Labour students' organisation Pulse, and later the Labour Party youth branch, Forum Żgħażagħ Laburisti, both of which he presided till 2017.

Saliba worked as a journalist for One Productions (the Labour party media house) from 2008 till 2013. After graduating as lawyer, in 2013-2017 he advised several Labour ministers, including Helena Dalli and Ian Borg, and Parliamentary Secretary Stefan Buontempo. In 2017-2018 he headed the EU Secretariat.

For 10 years,  Saliba was also a member of the Labour Party's National Executive – a post to which he was elected with the largest number of votes from delegates in 2018. The same year, he was offered by Prime Minister Joseph Muscat to contest the 2019 European Parliament election in Malta.

In 2018 Saliba married Sarah Agius, former mayor of Żebbuġ. The couple merged their surname, and Saliba admitted this would help him in the upcoming vote, due to the higher alphabetical position (so called "donkey vote"). They reside in Siġġiewi.

With 35,823 votes of preference, in May 2019 Agius Saliba was elected at the European Parliament. He served as rapporteur of the Digital Services Act, a role for which Politico Europe listed him as one of the 20 MEPs to watch during 2020. In December 2021 he was elected as one of the nine vice-presidents of the S&D group.

References

Living people
MEPs for Malta 2019–2024
Labour Party (Malta) MEPs
1989 births
People from Pietà, Malta
People from Siġġiewi
University of Malta alumni
21st-century Maltese politicians